Ugly Ego is the third album by the funk band Cameo, released in 1978.

Track listing
All tracks composed by Larry Blackmon; except where indicated
 "I'll Be with You" – 4:23  
 "Insane" – 5:01  
 "Give Love a Chance" – 4:50 (lyrics: Blackmon; music: Anthony  Lockett)
 "I Want You" – 4:09  
 "Ugly Ego" – 4:53 (Blackmon, lyrics: Tomi  Jenkins)
 "Anything You Wanna Do" – 3:32 (Blackmon, music: Eric Durham)
 "Friend to Me" – 5:13 (Blackmon, lyrics: Zelda Black)
 "Two of Us" – 4:32

Personnel
Larry Blackmon - lead vocals, drums, percussion
 Gregory Johnson - keyboards, piano, vocals
Gary Dow - bass guitar
Anthony Lockett - guitar, vocals
Eric Durham  - guitar
Arnett Leftenant - saxophone
Nathan Leftenant - trumpet
Tomi Jenkins, Wayne Cooper - vocals

Charts

Singles

References

External links
 Ugly Ego at Discogs

Cameo (band) albums
1978 albums